Dortmund-Aplerbeck station is a railway station in the Aplerbeck district of the town of Dortmund, located in North Rhine-Westphalia, Germany.

Rail services

References

Aplerbeck